The following persons have served as mayor or mayor pro tem of Eagle Mountain, Utah, since its incorporation on December 14, 1996.

 Debbie Hooge, December 1996 – October 1998
 Rob Bateman, October 1998 – January 1999
 Paul Bond, January 2000 – January 2002
 Kelvin Bailey, January 2002 – June 2005 
 Vincent Liddiard (pro tem), July 2005 – August 2005
 David Lifferth, August 2005 – November 2005 
 Brian Olsen, November 2005 - November 2006    
 Linn Strouse  (pro tem), November 2006 – November 2006
 Don D. Richardson, November 2006 – December 2007
 Heather Jackson, January 2008 - December 2013 
 Christopher Pengra, January 2014 – August 2017 
 John Painter (interim), August 2017 - December 2017

Notes 

Eagle Mountain, Utah
Eagle Mountain: Mayors